Rhys Lovett (born 15 June 1997) is an English professional footballer who plays as a goalkeeper for Torquay United.

He spent seven years in the academy at Walsall, from where he was loaned out to the youth teams at Aston Villa and Coventry City. He spent a season with Rochdale's youth-team, before signing with Cheltenham Town in August 2015. From there was loaned out to Tiverton Town, Shepton Mallet and Shortwood United, being named as Shortwood's Player of the Year for the 2016–17 season. He made his first-team debut for Cheltenham in August 2017, but only made a total of seven appearances for the club before he left in June 2020.

Club career
Lovett spent seven years in Walsall's academy, where he had loan spells at Aston Villa and Coventry City, before joining Rochdale permanently in 2014. He played a pre-season game for Gloucester City in July 2015. Lovett moved on to join Cheltenham Town in August 2015, ahead of their National League campaign. Following this, Lovett immediately joined Southern League Division One South & West club Tiverton Town on a short-term loan deal. He made his competitive debut on the opening day of the 2015–16 season, a 2–0 defeat at North Leigh. He played the next three games for Martyn Rogers's "Yellows". He joined Shepton Mallet on a one-month loan on 19 December 2015. He remained Gary Johnson's third choice goalkeeper at Cheltenham for the title winning season of 2015–16, behind Dillon Phillips/Jonathan Flatt and Calum Kitscha. He spent the 2016–17 season on loan at Southern League Division One South & West side Shortwood United, where he was named as the club's Player of the Year. He signed a new contract at Cheltenham in April 2018.

He made his first-team debut for Cheltenham on 15 August 2017, in am EFL Trophy tie against Swansea City U23s at Whaddon Road, which resulted in a 2–1 defeat. With regular custodian Scott Flinders undergoing surgery, Lovett made his League Two debut for Cheltenham on the final day of the 2017–18 season, a 2–1 defeat at Crewe Alexandra. He featured in one EFL Trophy game in the 2018–19 campaign and signed a new one-year contract in May 2019. He played four times during the 2019–20 season, replacing Flinders 62 minutes into a 3–0 victory over Oldham Athletic. He then returned on loan to Tiverton Town following the signing of loanee Owen Evans. He left at the end of his contract in June 2020. He thanked goalkeeping coach Steve Book but said that "Robins" boss Michael Duff told him that he was unable him offer him the first-team games he needed at that point in his career. He had a trial at Port Vale in August 2020.

Lovett signed for Gloucester City in October 2020. He played 14 times in all competitions before leaving the club in March 2021 to seek first-team football after the National League North season was declared null and void. He signed for Maidenhead United on 26 March 2021. He made his debut on 1 May against King's Lynn Town, deputising for the injured Taye Ashby-Hammond. On the final day of the season, he came on as substitute against Boreham Wood to play as a forward, and scored in the 93rd minute. Lovett left Maidenhead on 17 December 2021, before signing for Billericay Town the same day. 

On 15 July 2022, Lovett returned to the National League to join Torquay United.

Career statistics

Honours

Cheltenham Town
National League Winners: 2015-16

Individual
Shortwood United Player of the Year: 2016–17

References

1997 births
Living people
English footballers
Black British sportspeople
Association football goalkeepers
Walsall F.C. players
Aston Villa F.C. players
Coventry City F.C. players
Rochdale A.F.C. players
Cheltenham Town F.C. players
Tiverton Town F.C. players
Shepton Mallet F.C. players
Shortwood United F.C. players
Gloucester City A.F.C. players
Maidenhead United F.C. players
Billericay Town F.C. players
Torquay United F.C. players
English Football League players
National League (English football) players
Southern Football League players